Assassin is an upcoming American thriller film starring Nomzamo Mbatha, Dominic Purcell, and Bruce Willis (in his final film role). It was directed by Jesse Atlas, in his feature film directorial debut, written by Aaron Wolfe, and is based on Atlas and Wolfe's short film Let Them Die Like Lovers.

Assassin is set to be released by Saban Films in select theaters and VOD on March 31, 2023.

Premise
A private military operation led by Valmora invents futuristic microchip tech that enables the mind of an agent to inhabit the body of another person to carry out covert, deadly missions. But when Agent Sebastian is killed during a secret mission, his wife, Alexa, must take his place in an attempt to bring the man responsible to justice.

Cast
 Nomzamo Mbatha as Alexa
 Dominic Purcell as Adrian
 Bruce Willis as Valmora
 Mustafa Shakir as Sebastian
 Andy Allo as Mali
 Hannah Quinlivan as Special Agent
 Fernanda Andrade as Olivia
 Barry Jay Minoff as Marko
 Eugenia Kuzmina as Trainer

Production
On April 29, 2021, it was announced that Bruce Willis would star in Soul Assassin, a thriller film in which Nomzamo Mbatha and Dominic Purcell entered negotiations to star. Filming began on June 15, 2021, in Bessemer, Alabama. In July 2021, Saban Films acquired the distribution rights to the film. In the same month, Barry Jay Minoff was cast in an undisclosed role, while Jeff Elliott was revealed to have produced the film, through Endless Media Brickell & Broadbridge International, alongside 120dB Films. In August 2021, Mustafa Shakir was cast in an undisclosed role. The film was retitled to Die Like Lovers and later to its current title Assassin. Assassin is the last film to star Willis, who retired from acting because he was diagnosed with frontotemporal dementia. By May 2022, Hannah Quinlivan and Fernanda Andrade were set to appear in undisclosed roles.

Release
Assassin is set to be released by Saban Films in select theaters and VOD on March 31, 2023. The film was originally set to be released in September 2022, under the title Die Like Lovers.

References

External links
 

Upcoming films
2020s American films
2020s English-language films
2023 action adventure films
2023 action thriller films
2023 directorial debut films
2023 films
2023 independent films
American independent films
American thriller films
Features based on short films
Films shot in Alabama
Saban Films films
Upcoming directorial debut films
Upcoming English-language films